In mathematics, a fundamental discriminant D is an integer invariant in the theory of integral binary quadratic forms. If  is a quadratic form with integer coefficients, then  is the discriminant of Q(x, y). Thus, all such integers are referred to as discriminants in this theory.

There are explicit congruence conditions that give the set of fundamental discriminants. Specifically, D is a fundamental discriminant if and only if one of the following statements holds

 D ≡ 1 (mod 4) and is square-free,
 D = 4m, where m ≡ 2 or 3 (mod 4) and m is square-free.

The first ten  positive fundamental discriminants are:
 1, 5, 8, 12, 13, 17, 21, 24, 28, 29, 33 .

The first ten  negative fundamental discriminants are:
 −3, −4, −7, −8, −11, −15, −19, −20, −23, −24, −31 .

Connection with quadratic fields 

There is a connection between the theory of integral binary quadratic forms and the arithmetic of quadratic number fields. A basic property of this connection is that D0 is a fundamental discriminant if, and only if, D0 = 1 or D0 is the discriminant of a quadratic number field. There is exactly one quadratic field for every fundamental discriminant D0 ≠ 1, up to isomorphism. This is the reason why some authors consider 1 not to be a fundamental discriminant, although one may interpret D0 = 1 as the discriminant of the quadratic algebra consisting of two copies of the rational field.

Factorization
Fundamental discriminants may also be characterized by their factorization into positive and negative prime powers. Define the set

where the prime numbers congruent to 1 mod 4 are positive and those congruent to 3 mod 4 are negative. Then, a number D0 ≠ 1 is a fundamental discriminant if, and only if, it is the product of pairwise relatively prime members of S.

References

See also 
Quadratic integer

Algebraic number theory